HND or H&D may refer to:

Transport 
 Haneda Airport, serving Tokyo, Japan
 Hanborough railway station, in England
 Henderson Executive Airport, in Nevada, United States
 Hinterland Aviation, an Australian airline

Other uses 
 Croatian Journalists' Association
 Hexanitrodiphenylamine, an explosive
 Higher National Diploma
 Honduras, ISO-3166-1 alpha3 country code
 SLC6A19, a protein
 hnd, ISO 639-3 code for the Southern Hindko language of Pakistan
 H&D, a duo composed by Hangyul and Dohyon, former members of X1, who then redebuted as members of BAE173.